Joyce Dyer (born July 20, 1947) is a U.S. writer of nonfiction. Her memoir Goosetown:  Reconstructing an Akron Neighborhood tells the story of the author's attempt to remember the first five years of her life growing up in an ethnic neighborhood in Akron called Old Wolf Ledge (known to residents as "Goosetown"), famous for its glacial formations, breweries, and cereal mills. Goosetown is the prequel to Gum-Dipped: A Daughter Remembers Rubber Town, her book about the decades when Akron was the Rubber Capital of the World. In it Dyer provides a loving but complicated portrait of her father and a view of the relationship between the Firestone Tire and Rubber Company, its employees, and the city of Akron, Ohio.  An earlier memoir, In a Tangled Wood: An Alzheimer's Journey, was published by Southern Methodist University Press in 1996, shortly after the death of Annabelle Coyne, the author's mother. Dyer has also edited two collections of essays,  Bloodroot: Reflections on Place by Appalachian Women Writers and From Curlers to Chainsaws:  Women and Their Machines.  Her first book, The Awakening:  A Novel of Beginnings, was a scholarly study of Kate Chopin, a turn-of-the-century American writer. Joyce Dyer is Professor Emerita of English at Hiram College, where she directed the Lindsay-Crane Center for Writing and Literature and held the John S. Kenyon Chair in English for several years. Recipient of the 1998 Appalachian Book of the Year Award, the 2009 David B. Saunders Award in Creative Nonfiction, the 2016 Independent Book Publisher Gold Medal Award for anthology, and Ohio Arts Council Individual Excellence Awards, Dyer spent the last ten years working on a book about abolitionist John Brown, who grew up in Hudson, Ohio, where the author lives. A mix of memoir, biography, history, and travel writing, Pursuing John Brown: On the Trail of a Radical Abolitionist was published by the University of Akron Press in May of 2022. In this book for general readers, Dyer reveals surprising details about John Brown’s life and grapples with troubling questions he raises. It was named one of The Best Civil War Books of 2022 by Civil War Monitor. Dyer's biography is included in Contemporary Authors, volume 146, and in the New Revision Series, volume 91.

Background
Joyce Coyne (Dyer) was born in Akron, Ohio, during the summer of 1947. Her father, Thomas William (T.W.) Coyne, was a supervisor for the Firestone Tire and Rubber Company, and his experiences inspired Dyer to write Gum-Dipped: A Daughter Remembers Rubber Town. Dyer's mother was a clerk for the Board of Education in Akron. Dyer graduated with a B.A. in English from Wittenberg University and a Ph.D. in English from Kent State University. She taught at Lake Forest College in Lake Forest, Illinois, Western Reserve Academy in Hudson, Ohio, and Hiram College in Hiram, Ohio, where she held the John S. Kenyon Chair in English. In addition to publishing six books, she is the author of numerous essays that have appeared in periodicals such as North American Review, Writer's Chronicle, and the New York Times, as well as many anthologies. She has run workshops throughout the Appalachian South and Midwest and served on staff at such programs as 826michigan Writers Conference in Ann Arbor, The Twenty:  A Kentucky Writers Advance, the Antioch Writers' Workshop in Yellow Springs, Ohio, the Appalachian Writers Workshop in Hindman, Kentucky, the Wright State University Institute on Writing and Teaching in Dayton, Ohio, and the Highland Summer Conference in Radford, Virginia. A few years ago she served as visiting writer in creative nonfiction for the Northeast Ohio Master of Fine Arts in Creative Writing (NEOMFA). She lives with her husband, Daniel Osborn Dyer, in Hudson, Ohio.

Bibliography

Personal memoirs
(1996) In a Tangled Wood: An Alzheimer's Journey
(2003) Gum-Dipped: A Daughter Remembers Rubber Town
(2010) Goosetown: Reconstructing an Akron Neighborhood

Other nonfiction
(1993) The Awakening: A Novel of Beginnings
(2022) Pursuing John Brown: On the Trail of a Radical Abolitionist

Edited collections
(1998) Bloodroot: Reflections on Place by Appalachian Women Writers
(2016) From Curlers to Chainsaws:  Women and Their Machines

References

1947 births
Living people
Kent State University alumni
Hiram College faculty